Concord Records is an American record label owned by Concord and based in Los Angeles, California. Concord Records was launched in 1995 as an imprint designed to reach beyond the company's foundational Concord Jazz label. The label's artists have won 14 GRAMMY Awards and 88 GRAMMY nominations.

The original logo, a stylized eighth note incorporating the C and J of "Concord Jazz", was created by Bay Area graphic designer Dan Buck, who also worked on several album covers for the company.

History
In 1999, Concord Records was purchased by a consortium led by Hal Gaba and television producer Norman Lear. Its offices were moved from Concord, California to Beverly Hills in 2002. That same year, Concord  partnered with Starbucks to release Ray Charles's Genius Loves Company, which won eight GRAMMY Awards, including Album of the Year.

Concord Records purchased the Fantasy Label Group in 2004, and in December 2006 announced the reactivation of the Stax Records  label as a forum for newly recorded music.

In 2005, it was announced that Concord Records had purchased Telarc Records and its subsidiary Heads Up, in a deal whose terms were not divulged.

In 2007, Concord Records started the Hear Music label in association with Starbucks, signing such artists as Paul McCartney, Joni Mitchell, and John Mellencamp. Although Starbucks ceased to be an active partner a year later, Concord kept Hear active, having a Top 5 album in 2010 with Carole King and James Taylor's Live at the Troubadour.

In 2008, Village Roadshow Pictures Group and Concord Music Group completed their merger, resulting in the creation of the Village Roadshow Entertainment Group.

Kenny G signed to Concord in early 2008, Herb Alpert in early 2009. On June 5, 2009, Dave Koz signed to Concord.

In 2010, it was announced that Paul McCartney's solo and Wings catalogs would be globally distributed by Concord Music Group.

Current artists

Ben Williams
Benny Reid
Bill Evans
Billy Gibbons
Boney James
Bud Shank
Cal Tjader
Carl Fontana
Castlecomer
Charlie Byrd
Chick Corea
Christian Scott
Clare Fischer
Danielle Nicole
Dave Brubeck

Dave Koz
Dave McKenna
David Pack
Dee Bell
Dennis Rowland
Dirty Dozen Brass Band
Elbow
Elvis Costello
Ernestine Anderson
Esperanza Spalding
Fantasia Barrino
Fourplay
Frank Vignola
Fraser MacPherson
Gene Harris
George Benson
George Shearing

Herb Ellis
Jake Hanna
James Taylor
Jamison Ross
Javier Colon
Jonny Lang
Karrin Allyson
Kate Higgins
Ken Peplowski
Kenny G
Kenny Wayne Shepherd
Kristin Chenoweth
Kurt Elling
L.S. Dunes
Lindsey Stirling
Lizz Wright

Michael Feinstein
Molly Ringwald
Nnenna Freelon
The Offspring
Paul Simon
Poncho Sanchez
Postmodern Jukebox
Quiana Lynell
Rachael MacFarlane
Ramsey Lewis
Rob McConnell
Rosemary Clooney
Santana
Stefon Harris
Steve Perry
Stokley Williams
Sérgio Mendes
The New Pornographers
The Record Company
Valerie June
Tears For Fears
Zella Day

Former artists
AFI
Barry Manilow
Casey Abrams
Haley Reinhart
Michael Bolton
Terence Blanchard
Tony Bennett
Dionne Warwick

See also
 List of record labels

References

External links
 

American record labels
Jazz record labels
Labels distributed by Universal Music Group
Record labels based in California
Companies based in Los Angeles County, California
Companies based in Beverly Hills, California